The 2012–13 Algerian Basketball Cup is the 44th edition of the Algerian Basketball Cup. It is managed by the FABB and is held in Algiers, in the Hacène Harcha Arena on May 13, 2013.

Round of 32

Round of 16

Quarterfinals

Semifinals

Final

References

External links
basketalgerie.com

Algerian Basketball Cup
2013 in Algerian sport